Blondie's Secret is a 1948 American comedy film directed by Edward Bernds and starring Penny Singleton, Arthur Lake, Larry Simms, and Marjorie Ann Mutchie. It is the twenty-fourth of the 28 Blondie films.

Plot

Cast
 Penny Singleton as Blondie
 Arthur Lake as Dagwood
 Larry Simms as Baby Dumpling
 Marjorie Ann Mutchie as Cookie
Daisy as Daisy the Dog
 Jerome Cowan as Mr. Radcliffe
 Thurston Hall as Mr. Whiteside
 Jack Rice as Ollie Merton
 Danny Mummert as Alvin Fuddle
 Frank Orth as Mr. Philpotts
 Alyn Lockwood as Mary
 Eddie Acuff as Mr. Beasley

References

External links
 
 
 
 

1948 films
Columbia Pictures films
American black-and-white films
Blondie (film series) films
1948 comedy films
Films directed by Edward Bernds
American comedy films
1940s American films